Samuel Kyere (born June 6, 1983, in Berekum) is a Ghanaian football striker. He currently plays for Berekum Chelsea.

International
Kyere played his first match for the senior side Black Stars in 2008, he played the game on 19 November against Tunisia national football team.

References

External links
 
 

1983 births
Living people
Ghanaian footballers
Ghanaian expatriate footballers
Ghana international footballers
Association football midfielders
Ghanaian expatriate sportspeople in Egypt
People from Berekum
Al Ittihad Alexandria Club players
Berekum Arsenal players
Al Mokawloon Al Arab SC players
Berekum Chelsea F.C. players
Ghana Premier League players
Expatriate footballers in Egypt
Ittihad El Shorta SC players
Haras El Hodoud SC players